

Total statistics

Statistics by country

Statistics by competition 

Romanian football clubs in international competitions
FC Unirea Urziceni